The National Prison Department (DEPEN, Departamento Penitenciário Nacional in Portuguese) is the Brazilian government agency responsible for the security and administration of the Brazil federal prison system (Sistema Penitenciário Federal). This agency was reorganized in 2006, with the passage of several new laws and the construction of new prisons.

Federal prisons
There are five prisons in the system.
 Porto Velho, Rondônia
 Mossoró, Rio Grande do Norte
 Campo Grande, Mato Grosso do Sul
 Brasília, Distrito Federal
 Catanduvas, Paraná

See also
Federal Police of Brazil

References

Federal law enforcement agencies of Brazil